NA-177 Muzaffargarh-III is a newly-created constituency for the National Assembly of Pakistan. It mainly consists of the city of Muzaffargarh along with a majority of the areas of Muzaffargarh Tehsil.

Area
Muzaffargarh City
Basira
Kumdad Qureshi

Election 2018

See also
NA-176 Kot Addu-cum-Muzaffargarh
NA-178 Muzaffargarh-II

References 

Muzaffargarh

Constituencies of Muzaffargarh
Politics of Muzaffargarh
Constituencies of Punjab, Pakistan
Constituencies of Pakistan